Earl Thomas Coleman (born May 29, 1943) is an American politician who represented Missouri in the United States House of Representatives from 1976–1993.

Education 
He attended public schools and received a B.A. from William Jewell College in 1965 and an M.P.A. from New York University's, Wagner School of Public Service, in 1969. He also received a J.D. from Washington University School of Law in 1969. He was admitted to the Missouri Bar in 1969 and commenced practice in Kansas City.

Career 
From 1969 to 1972 Coleman, a Republican, served as Missouri's State Assistant Attorney General. In 1972, he was elected to the Missouri House of Representatives, where he served until 1976. After the unexpected death of Congressman Jerry Litton, Coleman ran for, and won, the election succeeding him. He represented Missouri's 6th Congressional District, which encompasses northwestern Missouri, including a portion of Kansas City north of the Missouri River and the city of Saint Joseph. Coleman served in Congress until 1993, when he was ousted by Pat Danner, Litton's former district administrator.  
After leaving office he has worked for The Livingston Group, a lobbying organization founded by former Congressman Bob Livingston.

Coleman wrote an opinion piece in May 2019 declaring that the Trump presidency was illegitimate and that Trump and Mike Pence should be impeached.

He currently sits on the bipartisan advisory board of States United Democracy Center.

References

External links

|-

|-

|-

1943 births
Lawyers from Kansas City, Missouri
Living people
Republican Party members of the Missouri House of Representatives
People from Gladstone, Missouri
Republican Party members of the United States House of Representatives from Missouri
Robert F. Wagner Graduate School of Public Service alumni
Washington University School of Law alumni
William Jewell College alumni
Members of Congress who became lobbyists